Tangshenoside I is a chemical compound isolated from Codonopsis pilosula.  It can be considered a syringin molecule bound to meglutol glucoside.

References 

Phenylpropanoids
Phenol glucosides